Putnam County is the name of nine counties in the United States of America:

Putnam County, Florida 
Putnam County, Georgia
Putnam County, Illinois
Putnam County, Indiana
Putnam County, Missouri
Putnam County, New York
Putnam County, Ohio
Putnam County, Tennessee
Putnam County, West Virginia

Other meanings
"Putnam County", a song by Tom Waits on his 1975 album Nighthawks at the Diner
The 25th Annual Putnam County Spelling Bee is a musical by William Finn and Rachel Sheinkin

See also 
Putnam (disambiguation)